The Ursulakapelle (St. Ursula's Chapel) is a catholic house of prayer in the German village of Gressenich, part of Stolberg, within the Diocese of Aachen.

History 
The chapel was built in the 18th century to thank God for his support during severe flooding by the rivulet Omerbach. During the Second World War the chapel, made of crushed stone, was severely damaged. It took the inhabitants of Gressenich many years to rebuild it. The chapel was dedicated on Corpus Christi 1954,

Architecture 
The chapel was built in Gothic style. Its dimensions are 7 by 3.70 meters. A characteristic feature is a three-sided apse in western direction. It can be reached through a door with a Gothic skylight.

See also 
Catholic Church in Germany

References

External links 
 Ursulakapelle (in German)

Roman Catholic chapels in Germany
Roman Catholic churches in North Rhine-Westphalia